Ephelis pudicalis is a species of moth in the family Crambidae. It is found in France and Spain.

References

Moths described in 1832
Odontiini
Moths of Europe